Vallis Alps are an electronic music duo based in Sydney, Australia, composed of producer David Ansari and vocalist Parissa Tosif, who are originally from Seattle and Canberra respectively.

Career

2015-2016: Vallis Alps
In January 2015, They released the tracks "Young" and "Thru" on Triple J and their first Extended play, Vallis Alps. Following the success of their debut EP, Vallis Alps announced their first Australian tour dates in August 2015, including a performance at Splendour in the Grass in July. The pair moved to Sydney in late 2015. Their 2015 was capped off with a nomination for the J Award for Unearthed Artist of the Year in 2015. "Young" went on to place number 27 on the Triple J Hottest 100, 2015. In November 2016, the duo released a new track titled "Fading". The track placed at number 94 on the Triple J Hottest 100, 2016.

2017-2021: Fable
In March 2017, the duo released "East", the lead single from the duo's second EP, Fable.

On 31 August 2017, the duo released a single, "Oceans", which tells the sacrifice women take and is also inspired upon the 19th century Iranian woman Tahirih who fought for women's rights in Iran.

2022-present: Cleave
In February 2023, Vallis Alps announced they will released debut album Cleave on 24 August 2023 via The Orchard. The album's third single "Higher Than This" was released on the same day.

Discography

Albums

Extended plays

Singles

Awards and nominations

J Award
The J Awards are an annual series of Australian music awards that were established by the Australian Broadcasting Corporation's youth-focused radio station Triple J. They commenced in 2005.

|-
| J Awards of 2015
|themselves
| Unearthed Artist of the Year
|

References

Australian pop music groups
Australian musical duos